Orkkatteri is a small town in Kozhikode district in the North Malabar region of state of Kerala, India. This is the center town for Eramala grama panchayath.

Economy
There is a strong agrarian sector, and the crops are mainly coconuts and arecanuts. Paddy cultivation has a major setback now, as is the case with most of Kerala, with paddy fields being claimed for houses and for more profitable crops. Migration to the Middle East (Gulf) and to the major cities in India is prevalent. There is a Saliya-theruvu where weaving is an important occupation.

Temples/Masjids 
There are two temples at Orkkatteri. The idol of the first temple is that of Shiva and the other is that of Devi. There is also one Ayyappa Temple located opposite of Shiva Temple. Recently renovate a Temple at Chattukulam (called Chattukulathamma, Devi) located at Manapuram area and myths behind this temple is in connection with Orkkatteri Devi Temple.

Orkkatteri Juma Masjids (old and new) are the main mosques in Orkkatteri town.
Maljaul masakeen Yatheem Khana (M M Orphanage) is situated in Orkkatteri town.

Cattle Market
Orkkatteri Kannukali Chanda (Cattle market) is a very famous festival in Malabar. It also known as Orkkatteri Thalappoli. It is part of festival of the two temples. It starts from 12 of Makaram (January) and lasts for four days. People belonging to all castes and communities participate in the festival.

Temples
Edathil Temple, Thacholi Temple, Paroli illam Temple and Koomully Temple are  other temples near orkkatteri town.

Theyyam dance
Both of these two temples are famous for Theyyam, Theyyam is one of the most outstanding ancient dance form of North Kerala. [The word 'Theyyam' originated from 'Daivam' means nothing but God. The Theyyam or Kolam (a form or shape), represents a mythological, divine or heroic character. There are around 400 Theyyams in northern Kerala. The bizarre head dresses, costumes and body painting and trance like performances are very extraordinary. Each one has a distinguishing headgear and costume made out of natural materials like coconut leaves and bark. Musical accompaniments are chenda, elathalam and kuzhal (horn). The Theyyams are exclusively performed by the male members of the traditional caste groups like Malayan, Vannan, Navilan, Pulayan, Koppalan and Velan]

Transportation
Orkkatteri village connects to other parts of India through Vatakara city on the west and Kuttiady town on the east.  National highway No.66 passes through Vatakara and the northern stretch connects to Mangalore, Goa and Mumbai.  The southern stretch connects to Cochin and Trivandrum.  The eastern Highway  going through Kuttiady connects to Mananthavady, Mysore and Bangalore. The nearest airports are at Kannur and Kozhikode.  The nearest railway station is at Vatakara.

See also
 Vatakara
 Nadapuram
 Thottilpalam
 Perambra
 Madappally
 Villiappally
 Memunda
 Iringal
 Mahe, Pondicherry
 Payyoli
 Thikkodi

References

External links
M M Orphanage

Vatakara areaorkkatteri_kannukali_chantha